Dr. Christian is a radio series with Jean Hersholt in the title role. It aired on CBS Radio from November 7, 1937 to January 6, 1954. In 1956, the series was adapted for television where it aired in syndication until 1957.

Hersholt had portrayed the character Dr. John Luke, based on Dr. Allan Roy Dafoe, the obstetrician who delivered and cared for the Dionne Quintuplets, in the 20th Century Fox movie The Country Doctor (1936) and its two sequels. He wanted to perform the same role on radio but could not get the rights. He decided to create his own doctor character for radio, and since he was a Hans Christian Andersen enthusiast, he borrowed that name for his character of philosophical Dr. Paul Christian.

Overview
The program debuted as The Vaseline Program: Dr. Christian of River's Bend. Dr. Christian practiced in the Midwest town of River's End with the assistance of Nurse Judy Price (Rosemary DeCamp, Lurene Tuttle, Kathleen Fitz, Helen Claire). With the opening theme music of "Rainbow on the River," Dr. Christian was introduced on CBS November 7, 1937, on The Vaseline Program, aka Dr. Christian's Office and later Dr. Christian, sponsored by Chesebrough Manufacturing Company's Vaseline.

The small-town physician's good humor, innate common sense and scientific training helped drive off a series of villainous types who tried to interfere with the peaceful lifestyle of River's End, as well as dealing with personal problems among his many patients and the majority of those who lived in town. The program was also unique in that, by the mid-1940s, listeners contributed the majority of the scripts (some were "professionally polished" before they were used), and an annual script-writing competition introduced in 1942 was the highlight of every season- top prize: the $2,000 "Dr. Christian Award" {with several $500 "runner-up" prizes}; among the later winners were Rod Serling and Earl Hamner, Jr. Produced by Dorothy McCann, the radio series became a popular success, continuing on CBS until January 6, 1954.

Hersholt was so strongly identified with the role that he received mail asking for medical advice.

There were various spin-offs; Hersholt co-wrote a Dr. Christian novel and made a series of six family films as Christian for RKO from 1939 to 1941.

Films
In release order:
 Meet Dr. Christian (1939)
 The Courageous Dr. Christian (1940)
 Dr. Christian Meets the Women (1940)
 Remedy for Riches (1940)
 Melody for Three (1941)
 They Meet Again (1941)

Television
In 1956, the Dr. Christian character made the transition to television in a 39-episode syndicated Ziv Television series, scripted by Gene Roddenberry, with Macdonald Carey as his nephew Dr. Mark Christian. Jean Hersholt appeared for the last time as Dr. Christian in the first episode, officially turning his medical practice over to his nephew. Shortly after filming the episode, Hersholt died on June 2, 1956.

Among the series' guest stars was Mason Alan Dinehart, who played Danny Martin in the 1957 episode entitled "Typhoid". Stacy Harris appeared in the same segment as Warren.

In the episode "The Sprained Thumb" of the 1950s TV show The Honeymooners, Ralph Kramden sarcastically asks Trixie Norton, "Well, Dr. Christian, have you got any more suggestions?"

Season 1 (1956-57)

Listen to
Free OTR: Dr. Christian (175 free episodes)

References

External links
Jean Hersholt: The Complete Andersen
Dr. Christian at CVTA
Jerry Haendiges Vintage Radio Logs: Dr. Christian
 

1930s American radio programs
1940s American radio programs
1950s American radio programs
Radio programs adapted into films
Radio programs adapted into television shows
Television series based on radio series
1956 American television series debuts
1957 American television series endings
1950s American drama television series
1950s American medical television series
Black-and-white American television shows
English-language television shows
First-run syndicated television programs in the United States
CBS Radio programs
Television series by Ziv Television Programs
Television shows set in the Midwestern United States